Callaphididae is a family of true bugs belonging to the order Hemiptera.

Genera:
 Bacillaphis Quednau, 1954
 Dataiphis Linnaeus, 1995
 Nippocallis Matsumura, 1917
 Saruallis
 Synthripaphis Quednau, 1954

References

Hemiptera
Hemiptera families